Alvania beanii is a species of minute sea snail, a marine gastropod mollusc or micromollusk in the family Rissoidae.

Description

Distribution
This species is distributed in European waters, from the North Coast of Norway and the North East Atlantic Ocean  down to the Canary Islands. It can also be found in the Mediterranean Sea.

References

Rissoidae
Gastropods described in 1844